Wainuiomata is an association football club in New Zealand, based in the Lower Hutt suburb of Wainuiomata. The club was founded in 1959 and was a founding member of the Wellington Central League. It includes seven men's teams and two women's teams, as well as over 20 youth sides. The senior men's team plays in the Capital Premier League.

Notable former players
Malcolm Dunford
Dave Houghton
Grant Turner

External links
Club official website

Association football clubs in Wellington
Sport in Lower Hutt
Association football clubs established in 1959
1959 establishments in New Zealand